Darrell Till (born 1975 in Blackpool, Lancashire, England) is an English singer-songwriter, composer, and author. His work as a composer to the soundtrack of Prism Award-winning short film Post Apocalyptic Bunny Makes Toast brought him to the attention of the public in 2003. His longest-running musical project is 'Men From Earth', which primarily featured Till as a multi-instrumentalist, along with other contributors. Since 2019, he has released music mainly in his own name but still featuring guest musicians. 

In 2020, Till contributed new cover versions of songs by They Might Be Giants to two compilation albums, Flood - They Might Be Songposting and Glean for Australia, the latter of which raised funds to help aid the fire recovery efforts in Australia following the 2019–20 Australian bushfire season. He also released a compilation album, Pocket Repeat, which brought together re-mastered work from his two projects 'Men From Earth' and 'The Ohms', as well as an EP of brand-new material "Falling Apart EP.

He is also co-founder of the comedy duo Tiny Lapel along with Russell Payne.

Discography
Throughout his career, he has released numerous studio albums, live albums, EPs, and singles. He has also collaborated on many other musical projects.
A Taste of Earwax EP (2000)
Men From Earth (2001)
Live in the Castle Gardens (2002)
Post Apocalyptic Bunny Makes Toast : Original Soundtrack (2003)
Out There EP (2004) Internet only
Out There (2004)
I Faked The Moon Landing (2006)
Flood - They Might Be Songposting (2020)
Glean for Australia (2020)
Pocket Repeat (2020)
Falling Apart EP (2020)
Digital Delectation (2021)

References

External links
 Darrell Till on Bandcamp
 Darrell Till on Soundcloud
 Tiny Lapel on Youtube

1975 births
Living people
English male singer-songwriters
English keyboardists
English rock singers
English buskers
English science fiction writers
English screenwriters
English male screenwriters
English male short story writers
British male novelists
English male non-fiction writers
English short story writers
People from Blackpool
21st-century English singers
21st-century British male singers